The 1966–68 Libyan Premier League was the 4th edition of the competition since its inception in 1963.

Overview
Al-Tahaddy Benghazi won the championship.

League standings

Final
Al-Tahaddy Benghazi 2-0 Al-Ittihad Tripoli
Al-Tahaddy Benghazi won the championship.

References
Libya - List of final tables (RSSSF)

Libyan Premier League seasons
Libya
Libya
Premier League
Premier League